Bangers and Mash (often Bangers & Mash) is a British children's cartoon series originally broadcast on Children's ITV in 1989, and repeated until around 1993. The series consists of 25 five-minute episodes. A video game based on the show was published in 1992.

Synopsis
Bangers and Mash were two troublemaking chimpanzees, and through wanting to have fun, caused grief for others, namely making a mess or breaking something of importance, normally belonging to their parents (or Gran, who also lived with them). Like all the inhabitants of their island, they lived in a house built on top of a tree (their address being No. 3 Tree Street).

Other characters of significance on the show include Bangers' and Mash's parents, their grandmother, their dog Mick, their friend Petal (who would often physically hurt them if their antics annoyed her too much), their teacher Mrs. Chum (who often resorted to the same punishment; making them write their ABC's ten times) and the local witch, Mrs. Snitchnose; a rat-like creature with a long nose with hairs coming on the end of it.

Production history
The series revolves around the adventures of two chimpanzees, Bangers and Mash, and is based on a series of children books by Paul Groves and Edward McLachlan. This series of reading books were used in schools in the 1980s. The series' narration and character voices were provided by Jonathan Kydd, and the incidental music and theme tune were written and performed by Chas & Dave. The series was also exported to New Zealand and Australia where it aired on Channel 2 and ABC respectively.

Episodes

Crew

Created by: Paul Groves & Edward McLachlan
Narrated by: Jonathan Kydd
Music by: Chas & Dave
Directed by: Ian Sachs
Based on the books by: Paul Groves
Storyboard & Backgrounds: Edward McLachlan
Layouts: John Riley-Cooper
Animation: Geoff Loynes
Paint & Trace Supervisor: Mairie Turner
Tracer: Alma Sachs
Painters: Lynne Sachs & Jo Behit
Checkers: Chris Lambrou & Steve Colwell
Camera: Mo Simmons & Isabelle Perrichon
Editor: Andi Sloss
Assistant Editor: Jacqueline Munro
Production Supervisor: Robert Dunbar
Production Manager: Miles Foster
Production Assistants: Simon Cox & Scott Heasmer
Production Secretary: Nimet Murji
Assistant Director: Barry Macey
Producer: Barrie Edwards
Executive Producer: Graham Clutterbuck 
 A FilmFair Production for Central Television

VHS releases

United Kingdom

References

External links
Bangers and Mash at Toonhound

1989 British television series debuts
1989 British television series endings
1980s British children's television series
1980s British animated television series
British children's animated adventure television series
British children's animated comedy television series
ITV children's television shows
English-language television shows
Animated television series about apes
Television series by Cookie Jar Entertainment
Television series by FilmFair
Television series by DHX Media
Television series by ITV Studios
Television shows produced by Central Independent Television
Australian Broadcasting Corporation original programming
Animated television series about brothers